The Collection is a DVD released by the band Earth, Wind & Fire on February 15, 2005 on Sony Music. The DVD consists of music videos and live performances of some of the band's songs.

Track listing

Charts

References

Earth, Wind & Fire video albums
2005 video albums
Music video compilation albums
2005 compilation albums